Grangemockler is a village, civil parish and townland in southeastern County Tipperary, Ireland. As of the 2011 census, Grangemockler townland had a population of 193 people.

Grangemockler is the home of Grangemockler/Ballyneale GAA club. The local Roman Catholic church is dedicated to Saint Mary and was built .

People
 Michael Browne, cardinal of the Roman Catholic Church
 Pádraig de Brún, clergyman, mathematician, academic and president of University College Galway
 Michael Hogan, Gaelic footballer killed in the Croke Park massacre

See also
List of towns and villages in Ireland

References

Towns and villages in County Tipperary